Macrocystidia cucumis is a common, inedible mushroom of the genus Macrocystidia, often found in large numbers on needle litter or moist soil.

Description
The gills are white, later reddish and quite crowded. The spores are variable in colour: white, pink, brown have all been observed. The stipe is a similar colour to the cap, thin, and velvety at the base.
The flesh is white and has a smell of freshly cut cucumbers.

Distribution and habitat
Macrocystidia cucumis was originally described in Europe where it is most common, and it is also known from North America, Australia and New Zealand.  It can be found in forests, disturbed grounds and gardens and its preferred substrate is wood debris.

References

External links
 
 

Marasmiaceae
Fungi described in 1796
Fungi of Europe